The Rolls-Royce Buzzard was a British piston aero engine of  capacity that produced about . Designed and built by Rolls-Royce Limited it is a V12 engine of  Bore and  Stroke. Only 100 were made. A further development was the Rolls-Royce R engine. The Buzzard was developed by scaling-up the Rolls-Royce Kestrel Engine.

Variants
List from Lumsden.
Buzzard IMS, (H.XIMS)
(1927), Maximum power , nine engines produced at Derby.
Buzzard IIMS, (H.XIIMS)
(1932-33), Maximum power , reduced propeller drive ratio (0.553:1), 69 engines produced at Derby.
Buzzard IIIMS, (H.XIVMS)
(1931-33), Maximum power , further reduced propeller drive ratio (0.477:1), 22 engines produced at Derby.

Applications

 Blackburn Iris Mark V
 Blackburn M.1/30
 Blackburn Perth
 Handley Page H.P.46 
 Kawanishi H3K
 Short Sarafand
 Vickers Type 207

Specifications (Buzzard IMS)

See also

References

Notes

Bibliography

 Lumsden, Alec. British Piston Engines and their Aircraft. Marlborough, Wiltshire: Airlife Publishing, 2003. .
 Rubbra, A.A.Rolls-Royce Piston Aero Engines - A Designer Remembers. Rolls-Royce Heritage Trust. Historical Series no 16. 1990. ]

External links

Flight magazine - Period Rolls-Royce Buzzard advertisement, August 1933

Buzzard
1920s aircraft piston engines